Lee Turnbull is a British actor who has appeared in The Famous Five, Making Waves and The Bill. He appeared on stage at the Old Red Lion in 2004 as part of the cast of Cherry Picnic.In 2010 he toured the U.S with 360 Ent's production of Peter Pan. After two years of touring he decided to move Stateside permanently. 
He then went on to write and direct the award winning play 'Love Is' that premiered at the Hollywood Fringe Festival where he subsequently won the International Award for best play.
He now coaches soccer full time.

Selected screen credits
The Street (2010)
Zebra Crossings (2008) -  Justin 
Cass (2008) - Male Diner 
Waking the Dead - Francis Duggan 
Holby Blue - Darren Edgar 
Border Work (2007) - Rob 
Wire in the Blood - Danny Ellis 
Hole in the Heart (2006) - Danny Ellis
The Bill - Ben Thompson 
Over the Hill (2001) - Jason Wyatt
Set-Up (1999) - Michael Finney
Casualty - Martin Hooper 
Worlds Apart (2006) - Martin Hooper
Shameless - Randy Soldier 
Making Waves - OM Mickey Sobanski 
The Vice - Ricky
Gameboys (2003) TV episode - Ricky
Shooters (2002) - Runners kid 
Lloyd & Hill (2001) - Dave Britten 
Hope & Glory - Tom Warrior
The Railway Children (2000) - Draper's Boy 
Reach for the Moon (2000) TV mini-series 
Holby City - Peter Jenkins
Silent Witness - Todd 
A Kind of Justice (1999) TV episode - Todd
The Famous Five - Sniffer 
Five Go to Mystery Moor (1996) TV episode - Sniffer
No Bananas (1996) TV mini-series - Richard 
The Vet - Matthew Cronin 
Nothing But the Truth (1995) - Matthew Cronin
Willie's War (1994) -  Willie

External links
 

English male stage actors
English male television actors
Living people
Year of birth missing (living people)